A Different Kind of Human (Step 2) is the second studio album by Norwegian singer-songwriter and record producer Aurora. It was released on 7 June 2019 by Decca and Glassnote Records. It succeeds the album's first and previous chapter Infections of a Different Kind (Step 1), which was released in September 2018. Aurora collaborated with producers including Magnus Skylstad, MyRiot, Askjell Solstrand, Odd Martin, Mark Ralph, Toby Gad, and Kill Dave during its recording. It has been categorised to be a pop, art pop, and electropop concept album.

Background and production

On the same day of the release of Infections of a Different Kind (Step 1), Aurora confirmed in an interview with NME that Step 2 would be released either in 2019 or 2020. Months later, Aurora posted a photo which seems to be an alien invasion with a text that said "Something is coming in 2019" in Morse code, which hinted that Step 2 would be set to be released in 2019.

On 24 December 2018, Aurora announced in an interview for Bergens Tidende that Step 2 is coming faster than expected, most likely because she and Magnus Skylstad had been in the studio for a very long time. A Different Kind of Human (Step 2) was recorded in November 2018 in a "tiny room", in which Aurora and Skylstad did not sleep to finish the album.

Music and lyrics
Musically, A Different Kind of Human (Step 2) combines pop, art pop, and electropop, while drawing influences from Native American, African, Norwegian and Japanese folk music. The record has been described to be a concept album that tackles themes of ecological crisis that "aim at society's self-centred capitalistic apathy."

Release and promotion
On 18 February 2019, Aurora announced that the title would not be under the assumed title of Infections of a Different Kind (Step 2), and it would have a different name. "It's kind of what I would hope for the music to do to us", Aurora said about Step 2s title. The singer revealed that she was planning a sequel, known as Step 3, expected to be released after her third studio album The Gods We Can Touch (2022).

Singles
The album's first single, "Animal", was released on 24 January 2019 alongside a music video released the same day. At the end of March, "The Seed" was confirmed to be the second single from the project. Following the announcement, the album title and tracklist were revealed on 4 April 2019. On 10 May 2019, the song "The River" was released as the album's third single. It was followed by the promotional single "A Different Kind of Human", released on 31 May 2019. The singles "Apple Tree" and "Daydreamer" were released on 26 September 2019 and 1 November 2019, respectively.

Critical reception

At Metacritic, which assigns a weighted average score out of 100 to reviews and ratings from mainstream publications, A Different Kind of Human (Step 2) received an average score of 77, based on 7 reviews, indicating "generally favorable reviews".

AllMusic editor Marcy Donelson wrote that "while uneven, it's an album that sticks, both for its theatrical melodies and uncommon benevolence." Michael Cragg of The Guardian suggested that the album "would have benefited from its predecessor's [Infections of a Different Kind (Step 1)] brevity" and added that it "deserves wider attention." NME reviewer Andrew Trendell lauded the album's production, and message but commented that "Aurora's idiosyncrasies – which mostly set this album apart – sometimes also weigh it down." Clashs Malvika Padin highlighted that "Aurora consistently plays to her lyrical strength, as meaningful words [...] make a home within the listeners psyche."

Track listingNotes'
  signifies a co-producer
  signifies an additional producer.

Charts

Certifications

Release history

References

2019 albums
Aurora (singer) albums
Art pop albums
Decca Records albums
Glassnote Records albums